HTMW may refer to:

 Mwanza Airport, an airport in Tanzania
  High-temperature mineral wool, a high-temperature insulation made up of mineral fibers